Camila is a Mexican pop rock group formed in 2003 by Mario Domm and Pablo Hurtado. Until 2013, Samo was also part of this group.

Biographies
Founded by the award-winning composer, singer and producer Mario Domm (Coahuila, Mexico), Camila made its official debut in 2005 when Domm signed his first record contract with Sony BMG Norte, together with his friends and colleagues guitarist Pablo Hurtado (San Luis Potosí) and Veracruz native Samo. Camila made Todo Cambió (2006) and Dejarte de amar (2010), which gained them success in Latin America.
 
Songs like “Abrázame,” “Coleccionista de canciones,” “Todo cambió,” “Mientes,” “Aléjate de mí” and “Bésame,” have gained them three Latin Grammy Awards, three Billboard Awards, Diamond and Platinum certifications, and more than two million albums sold worldwide.

Additionally, they have performed in major venues, such as New York's and Los Angeles’ NOKIA, El Coliseo in Puerto Rico, in Barquisimeto, Venezuela (a concert with a hundred thousand people in attendance), el Gran Rex de Buenos Aires, Argentina and Viña del Mar, Chile, and Mexico. The band has also worked with international stars, such as Colbie Caillat, Kenny G, Alejandro Sanz, Alejandra Guzman, Reyli, Chambao, Aleks Syntek, and Wanessa Camargo.
 
In 2014, Camila launched a third studio album, Elypse. It was be the first album released as a duo since Samo left the group. “Decidiste dejarme,” was the leading single for the album.

Their fourth studio album, 9:30pm, was released in 2019.

Band members

Mario Domm 
Composer, singer, and producer born in Torreon, Coahuila, Mario Domm commands multiple musical instruments, such as: drums, piano, guitar, and bass.

He has worked with artists Alejandro Sanz, Taboo (of the Black Eyed Peas), Alejandra Guzmán, Kalimba, Reyli, Sin Bandera, Rosana, Jesse and Joy, Romeo, Alejandro Fernández and Thalía.
 
Domm lives in Los Angeles, California, where he works in his own recording studio named Pop The Cherry Studios.

Pablo Hurtado 
Guitarist and co-producer of Camila, Pablo Hurtado joined the project shortly before graduating in music production and audio engineer at the Fermatta Music School. He was born in Mexico City and grew up in San Luis Potosí in a family with artistic sensibilities.

He began playing the piano at the age of five and when he turned seven his father introduced him to classical guitar. As a teenager he tried the electric guitar. He began to play with several rock bands, and later became interested in musical theatre and progressive music. At the age of 20, he returned to Mexico City and began his audio engineering studies, which opened his mind to other musical genres such as jazz, blues, funk and pop.
  
At present, sponsored by the guitar brand PRS, Pablo has acquired knowledge and refinement and shows a fresh perspective whether playing acoustic music or intricate solos, sweet ballads or daring ones. His talent has been essential as co-author of several songs in all three of Camila's albums (“Todo cambió”, “Dejarte de amar”, “Elypse”), which has allowed him to come in contact with giants of world music. He lives in Los Angeles, California, where he has his own recording studio, Cypress Overdrive Studios.

Former members
 Samo

Discography

 2006: Todo Cambió
 2010: Dejarte de Amar
 2014: Elypse
 2019: Hacia Adentro

References

External links
 Camila.Tv — Camila official website
 Twitter Camila
 Facebook Camila
 Instagram Camila
 Youtube Camila

Mexican pop music groups
Latin Grammy Award winners
Musical groups established in 2004
Sony Music Latin artists
Latin pop music groups